The following article outlines the discography of French hip hop duo Casseurs Flowters, consisting of rappers Orelsan and Gringe, which includes two studio albums, one mixtape and two singles.

Their debut studio album, Orelsan et Gringe sont les Casseurs Flowters, was released in 2013, with "Bloqué" as its lead single. In 2015, they released their second studio album, Comment c'est loin, which is also a soundtrack album for their film of the same name. Its lead single, "À l'heure où je me couche", was released a few weeks before the album's release.

Albums

Studio albums

Mixtapes

Singles

As lead artist

Other charted songs

Guest appearances

Music videos

See also
 Orelsan discography

Footnotes

References

External links
 

Discography
 
 
Hip hop discographies
Discographies of French artists